S. celebensis may refer to:

Scotophilus celebensis, the Sulawesi yellow bat, a vesper bat species
Strigocuscus celebensis, the Sulawesi dwarf cuscus, a marsupial species